Macroglossum albigutta is a moth of the  family Sphingidae. It is known from the Solomon Islands.

The length of the forewings is about 23 mm. It is a very dark species with a distinct white line above the eye. The abdomen upperside has two prominent white basal spots, brownish black side tufts and a yellow side patch. The underside of the palpus and middle of the thorax are greyish white. The thorax is dark brown laterally. The forewing upperside has an olive-black band proximal to the median band. The underside of both wings is dark brown, with the distal border being darker. The lines are indistinct.

Subspecies
Macroglossum albigutta albigutta
Macroglossum albigutta floridense Rothschild & Jordan, 1903 (Florida Island)

References

Macroglossum
Moths described in 1903